The international reaction to the Russo-Georgian War covered many nations, non-governmental organisations and non-state actors. The conflict began in August 2008 over South Ossetia but spread elsewhere in Georgia. The war had a considerable humanitarian impact and affected the financial markets of Russia and Georgia.

In general, Georgia accused Russia of aggression and invasion through land, air, and sea, whereas Russia accused Georgia of genocide and crimes against humanity targeting Ossetians and Russian peacekeepers. Most other countries called for peace, with some demanding respect of Georgia's territorial integrity while others supported Russian intervention.

National statements

States with limited recognition and non-state entities

Joint statements

International organisations

Popular protests regarding Russo-Georgian War

Popular protests for peace were held throughout Europe and in the United States as the war unfolded.

References

Russo-Georgian War
2008 in international relations
International reactions to armed conflicts
Reactions to 2000s events